The Sony Tablet P (former code name Sony S2) is a tablet computer that was manufactured by Sony as part of the Sony Tablet series.

Description 
It was released as the Android version of the Sony Vaio P who also had a wide screen.

It has two  touchscreen interoperating displays joined in a hinged clamshell layout, resembling the VAIO P series. It was released in November 2011, as the second available member of the Sony Tablet series. The suggested retail price is $599.

While the unique clamshell design allowed the device to fold in half and fit into a pocket, this feature resulted in the screen being split in half by a large, black hinge, which made playing games and reading awkward and is cited as the Tablet P's most serious flaw. The Tablet P was discontinued from Sony's American website by the end of 2012 and will not receive the update to Android 4.1 Jelly Bean

It has received an upgrade to Android 4.0.4.

Indian Express listed the tablet in a history article about weird Sony products.

See also 
 Surface Duo
 Dual-touchscreen

References 

P
Android (operating system) devices
Tablet computers introduced in 2011